The main power supply for Shetland is provided by Lerwick Power Station, located in Gremista,  northwest of Lerwick town centre. This is the principal source of electrical energy for Shetland, however currently about 20 MWe is provided by the Sullom Voe Terminal power station which comprises 4 x 23 MWe Gas Turbines, the future of which is uncertain. Opened on 27 May 1953 the station is diesel-fuelled and generates a total of 66 MW of power.

Equipment
Originally the facility had six 6 MWe Mirrlees diesel generator K Major sets (some of which have been decommissioned); two 8 MWe French Pielstick engines were added in 1983 and a further Finnish 12 MWe Wärtsilä (originally a Stork Werkspoor design) engine was commissioned in 1994. A waste-heat recovery system applied to the exhaust of the Wartsila only produces super-heated steam which runs a 2.1 MW WH Allen turbine, thus making this set a combined cycle. Two standby gas turbine generator units, each with a capacity of 5 MW, were installed in containers outside the existing buildings to augment peak output. The plant is operated by Scottish and Southern Energy (SSE).

Load balancing
The growth of output from wind turbines in Shetland has increased instability in the local grid (which is not connected to the national grid on mainland Scotland). SSE installed a 1 MW sodium–sulfur battery in a nearby building to ameliorate the peak loads. however due to safety concerns, the sodium-sulfur battery was removed prior to commissioning and the energy storage building was reconfigured to accommodate 3MWh of advanced lead-acid batteries.

Replacement plan
There are proposals to replace the power station at a new greenfield site north of the existing one. Planning permission has been granted for the development however the decision to proceed has been delayed by the proposed Shetland HVDC Connection, which depending on how it is implemented may make such a station redundant, or only required as standby, which would affect the type of plant chosen.

Lerwick District Heating
There is an adjacent but district heating network see Lerwick District Heating and Energy Recovery Plant.  However for a variety of reasons the rejected heat has never been used as a heat source for the network. This is unlikely to happen with the existing power station as it will be closed soon.

References

Natural gas-fired power stations in Scotland
Oil-fired power stations in Scotland
Buildings and structures in Shetland
Mainland, Shetland